Moschcowitz is a surname. Notable people with the name include:

 Alexis Moschcowitz (1865−1933), American surgeon
 Eli Moschcowitz (1879–1964), American doctor

See also
 Moskowitz
 Thrombotic thrombocytopenic purpura, also known as Moschcowitz syndrome